The Stadion am Zoo is a multi-purpose stadium in Wuppertal, Germany. It is currently used mostly for football matches and hosts the home matches of Wuppertaler SV. The stadium is able to hold 23,067 people and was built in 1924.

References 

Football venues in Germany
Wuppertaler SV
Sport in Wuppertal
Sports venues in North Rhine-Westphalia